Chryseobacterium shandongense  is a Gram-negative, rod-shaped, non-spore-forming and non-motile bacteria from the genus of Chryseobacterium which has been isolated from soil.

References

Further reading 
 

shandongense
Bacteria described in 2015